Ellis Cliffs is a ghost town in Adams County, Mississippi, United States.

Situated atop a high chalky bluff overlooking the Mississippi River, the white cliffs were frequently mentioned by early river voyagers.

History
The settlement is named for Richard Ellis, a native of Virginia who moved to the area with his family around 1785. Prior to Ellis, the Lieutenant Governor of West Florida, Montfort Browne, received a grant of land at this place and planned to locate the civil government at the site.

The Ellis family were one of the first to permanently settle in southwestern Mississippi, which was then still under Spanish rule.

Ellis established a plantation known as "White Cliffs", where "towering cliffs lined the east side of the river, providing a floodproof access to the water and vast acres of virgin land and timber".  The foundations of the family's first home were still visible in the early 1900s.

When Ellis died in 1792, he had accumulated  of land, and more than 150 slaves.

By 1800, both the settlement and the cliffs were known as "Ellis Cliffs".

British artist William Constable visited America between 1806–08 and painted View Down the Mississippi from Ellis's Cliffs, 28 Feby. 1807.  Artist John Rowson Smith traveled the Mississippi River before the Civil War and painted The Cotton Region, which included a scene of "the house of a colored slave owner at Ellis Cliffs".  Henry Lewis also painted the river, and described Ellis Cliffs as "strikingly bold, wild, and picturesque".

During the Civil War, Confederate batteries were installed at the top of Ellis Cliffs.

The former settlement is today covered by forest, and bordered to the north by the St. Catherine Creek National Wildlife Refuge.

References

Former populated places in Adams County, Mississippi
Former populated places in Mississippi
Mississippi populated places on the Mississippi River